Donald Duck Presents is an American animated television series that aired on The Disney Channel beginning in 1983 and which featured Disney animated shorts. Although Donald Duck shorts were the primary programming, additional cartoons featuring Goofy, Mickey Mouse, Chip 'n Dale, Pluto, as well as Silly Symphonies, Disney featurettes, and other Disney-based shorts were shown. The show was first aired on September 1, 1983, a few months after The Disney Channel was launched. Its timeslot for its early run was at 8 a.m. Eastern/Pacific Time, making it the third program of The Disney Channel's 16 (later 18) hour programming day.

Brief clips and segues featuring Donald Duck typically were placed between each short. The shorts often were edited down, removing the opening and closing credits, and in some cases, edited for length.

The opening of the show featured a cavalcade of scenes from Disney shorts, and a theme song. Unlike the opening of Good Morning, Mickey!, which features all of the characters in the theme, the opening of Donald Duck Presents features only Donald (and his nephews).

The show was replaced by Donald's Quack Attack in 1992.

Home media
This show was released only on VHS PAL in the UK as part of a six-volume set which also each featured an episode of Good Morning, Mickey!, Welcome to Pooh Corner, The Mouse Factory and Mousercise. Unlike the stateside version of Donald Duck Presents, however, there were no cartoon shorts released; that position was filled by Good Morning, Mickey!. Instead, it contained different Disney featurettes.
 Volume One contains "Adventures of J. Thaddeus Toad"
 Volume Two contains "A Day at Disneyland"
 Volume Three contains "Donald in Mathmagic Land"
 Volume Four contains "Bear Country"
 Volume Five contains "Magic and Music" and "Peter and the Wolf"
 Volume Six contains "Nature's Half Acre"

References

External links
 

1983 American television series debuts
1985 American television series endings
1980s American animated television series
1980s American anthology television series
American children's animated anthology television series
Disney Channel original programming
Disney animated television series
English-language television shows
Animated television series about ducks
Television series by Disney